Bimota model names reflect the origin of the engines they begin with: Yamaha engined models being with a "Y", Honda models with a "H", Suzuki versions with a "S", Kawasaki versions with a "K", and Ducati versions with a "D".  For example, the DB5 and SB8K are the 5th Ducati-engined and 8th Suzuki-engined models.

See also
List of Benelli motorcycles
List of Moto Guzzi motorcycles

References

Bimota